The R/V Odyssey Explorer was a salvage and recovery vessel owned by Odyssey Marine Exploration. It was sold in 2016 and renamed Empire Persia by the Latvian business conglomerate which purchased the vessel.

Falklands Conflict
In 1982 Odyssey Explorer was operating out of Kingston upon Hull under the name Farnella as a stern trawler. Upon the outbreak of the Falklands Conflict, Farnella, along with three sister ships, was taken up from trade by the Royal Navy and commissioned as a stop-gap minesweeper for operations in the South Atlantic. HMS Farnella was returned to her owners in October 1982.

Dispute with Spain
On October 16, 2007 Spain seized the Odyssey Explorer as it sailed out of port from the British overseas territory of Gibraltar. The vessel's captain, Sterling Vorus, claimed to have been in International Waters, but was forced to dock at Algeciras under what Vorus declared was "threat of deadly force". Once in port Vorus was eventually arrested for disobedience after refusing inspection of the vessel without first receiving approval of Odyssey Explorer'''s flag state, the Commonwealth of the Bahamas. Vorus was released the following day. Aboard the Odyssey Explorer'' at the time of seizure were about a dozen journalists and photographers, all of whom had their video tapes, tape recorders and computer memory storage devices seized by Spanish officials.

See also
 Archaeology of shipwrecks
 Maritime archeology
 Underwater archeology
 Wreck diving

References

Exploration ships
1972 ships